Joney Faragher is the current leader of the Manx Labour Party and, since 2021, a member of the House of Keys for the constituency of Douglas East.

References 

Manx politicians
Year of birth missing (living people)
Living people
Women in the Isle of Man